Akeem Ennis-Brown is an English professional boxer who held the British and Commonwealth light-welterweight titles from 2020 to August 2021.

Professional career
Brown made his professional debut on 11 July 2015, scoring a four-round points decision (PTS) victory against Ibrar Riyaz at the Chase Leisure Centre in Cannock, Staffordshire. After compiling a record of 8–0 (1 KO) he faced reigning champion Glenn Foot for the English light-welterweight title on 16 July 2017 at the Stadium of Light in Sunderland. Brown captured his first professional title via majority decision (MD) over ten rounds. Two judges scored the bout in favour of Brown at 98–92 and 96–94 while the third judge scored it a draw at 95–95.

Following a six-round PTS victory against Chris Truman in September, he faced Chris Jenkins for the vacant WBC Youth light-welterweight title on 12 May 2018 at the GL1 Leisure Centre in Gloucester. Jenkins suffered a cut above his right eye in the third round after an accidental clash of heads. On the advice of the ringside doctor, the referee called a halt to the contest in the fifth round, forcing the result to the scorecards. All three judges scored the bout in favour of Brown at 40–36, 39–37, and 39–38, awarding Brown the WBC Youth title via unanimous technical decision (TD).

His next fight was against Darragh Foley for the vacant IBF European light-welterweight title on 14 December 2018 at the York Hall in London. Brown captured the IBF regional title with a comfortable unanimous decision (UD), with the judges scorecards reading 98–92, 97–93, and 96–94.

Brown made a successful defence of his IBF European title with a ten-round UD victory against Bilal Rehman in March 2019, before challenging Commonwealth light-welterweight champion Philip Bowes, with the vacant British light-welterweight title also on the line, on 2 September 2020 at the Production Park Studios in South Kirkby, West Yorkshire. In a fight which saw both men suffer cuts and Bowes receive a point deduction in the eighth round for excessive holding, Brown secured a twelve-round UD victory to capture the British and Commonwealth titles. One judge scored the bout 116–111 and the other two scored it 115–112.

Professional boxing record

References

External links 

Living people
Year of birth missing (living people)
Date of birth missing (living people)
Sportspeople from Gloucester
English male boxers
Light-welterweight boxers
British Boxing Board of Control champions
Commonwealth Boxing Council champions
Black British sportspeople